Alberto Jackson Byington Jr. (18 May 1902 – 17 December 1964) was a Brazilian hurdler. He competed in the men's 110 metres hurdles at the 1924 Summer Olympics.

References

External links
 

1902 births
1964 deaths
Athletes (track and field) at the 1924 Summer Olympics
Brazilian male hurdlers
Olympic athletes of Brazil
Athletes from São Paulo